Grace Omaboe (born 10 June 1946), popularly known as Maame Dokono, is a Ghanaian actress, singer, television personality, author and a former politician. She run the former Peace and Love Orphanage which is now Graceful Grace school in Accra. She was honored by the organizers of 3Music Awards for her achievement in the entertainment industry in Ghana.

Early life 
Grace Omaboe was born on 10 June 1946 at Birim North in the Eastern region of Ghana. She attended Abetifi Girls School. Mother of veteran actress, Madam Rebecca Afia Daadom who hails from the Abirim in the Eastern Region and died at the age of 105. Grace became a household name through her acting role in the popular Akan Drama Series "OBRA" which was broadcast on GBC TV. Grace Omaboe was born an entertainer and her influence and authority have been felt in every department of show business – making her the face of Ghanaian show business for decades. Before her, there was none of her kind and after her prime; we are still looking out for the next. She tinkered with almost every sector of the industry and excelled. She did script-writing, acting, radio and TV presenting, fashion, music, and entrepreneurship and nailed every one of them to perfection .From humble beginnings as a scriptwriter for one of the legendary television series of all time, Osofo Dadzie – Grace Omaboe parlayed that into significant strides on the screens. She honed her skills as an influential member of the Abetifi Girls School and accepted to be a scriptwriter for the Osofo Dadzie group and after the group was disbanded, legendary producer, Nana Bosompra, encouraged her to act in a series she co-produced called Keteke on Ghana Broadcasting Corporation and that began her first acting role. After a while, she rebranded the TV series and changed the title to Obra – the longest-showing television series ever to grace the screens in Ghana.

Career 
Grace Omaboe was initially a writer on Osofo Dadzi in the 70s when she was encouraged by Nana Bosompra to act in a series she co produced called Keteke. Grace Omaboe first started acting in the Keteke TV series on Ghanaian State owned TV, GTV. She moved on from there to become one of the most sought after actress of her time when she starred in and produced the 1980s/1990s Akan drama series Obra on GTV and also co-hosted an educative story telling TV program for kids known us By The Fire Side. Popularly known as Maame Dokono (after she played a character as a kenkey seller), she moved on to feature in several Ghanaian movies both Akan and English. She starred in the 2013 short Kwaku Ananse and Children of the Mountain (2016).

In 2000 and 2004 Omaboe stood as parliamentary candidate for the National Democratic Congress (NDC) in New Abirem for Birim North Constituency in the Eastern Region. In 2008 Omaboe defected to the ruling New Patriotic Party (NPP). Omaboe claims that the NDC fabricated stories against her, which required her to fight and win a court case brought against her orphanage for criminal negligence. She quit politics in 2016, saying it was a waste of time, money, and full of people telling untruths.

Omaboe was selected to be President of the 2017 Golden Movie Awards Africa (GMAA) jury.

Filmography
Obra
Kwaku Ananse
I Surrender
P over D
Children of The Mountain
Amerikafo
Matters of the Heart
John and John
Crossfire
Sacrifice
Expectations
Keteke
Jewels
Jewels 2
 Aloe Vera

Personal life 
Grace Omaboe was married but divorced. Grace Omaboe has six children with two based in the United States, two in the Netherlands and the rest in Ghana.

Grace Omaboe has married twice but is currently separated from her second husband. She had four children with her first husband and two with her second husband. She attributes the relationship breakdowns partly to the demands of acting and irreconcilable differences around her career aspirations and the demands of family.

Speculations abound regarding the extent of Grace Omaboe's relationship with David Dontoh during their days on Keteke and Obra. It is believed that the pair dated for about four years during their heyday. David does not confirm or deny these rumours but insists that the two were very good friends and particularly close during the period when Grace Omaboe was separated from her first husband. Grace Omaboe is however more candid about their relationship and has disclosed that they dated for a while and even moved in together for some time. According to Grace, they were genuinely in love and had even considered marriage but decided against it on grounds of irreconcilable differences. David had wanted them to have a family together but Grace had already given birth to six children from her previous marriages. She was also beyond the age of 40 and had therefore made a personal decision not to have any more children. David was the younger of the two and yet to have any children of his own. The pair therefore separated by mutual consent but have remained close friends ever since.

References

External links

 

1946 births
Living people
Ghanaian film actresses
Ghanaian television personalities
20th-century Ghanaian actresses
21st-century Ghanaian actresses